Lucas Gomes can refer to:
Lucas Gomes Arcanjo (1971–2016), Brazilian police officer, murder victim
Lucas Leite (born 1982), Brazilian grappler
Lucas Gomes (footballer, born 1990) (1990–2016), Brazilian footballer
Lucas Farias (born 1994), Brazilian footballer
Lucas Gomes (footballer, born 1995), Brazilian footballer